is an interchange passenger railway station located in the city of Wakō, Saitama, Japan, operated by the private railway operator Tōbu Railway and Tokyo subway operator Tokyo Metro. It is the only Tokyo Metro station located in Saitama Prefecture. It is the westernmost station in the Tokyo subway network, and the northernmost Tokyo Metro station (Nishi-Takashimadaira on the Toei network is farther north).

Lines
Trains continuing onto the Tobu Tojo Line from Tokyo Metro lines all change drivers here: Tobu Railway drivers take over trains from Tokyo and Tokyo Metro drivers take over trains towards Tokyo. Located between Narimasu and Asaka stations, it is 12.5 km from the Ikebukuro terminus.

Station layout
The station consists of two island platforms serving four tracks. The two platforms, 2 and 3, used by Tokyo Metro services were equipped with chest-high platform edge doors in April 2012, with operation commencing in July 2012. Similar platform edge doors were installed on the Tōbu platforms, 1 and 4, in February 2016, and scheduled to be brought into operation from 26 March.

Platforms

History

Though originally written in hiragana, the station name was written in kanji (新倉駅) from July 21, 1934 onwards. On October 1, 1951, the station was renamed . On December 20, 1970, it was renamed Wakōshi Station.

Fukutoshin Line services started on June 14, 2008.

From March 17, 2012, station numbering was introduced on the Tōbu Tōjō Line, with Wakōshi Station becoming "TJ-11".

Chest-height platform edge doors were added to platforms 2 and 3 in April 2012, with operation commencing in July 2012.

Passenger statistics
In fiscal 2019, the Tōbu portion of the station was used by an average of 180,819 passengers daily. The Tokyo Metro portion of the station was used by an average of 192,132 passengers daily.

Surrounding area
 RIKEN
 Japan Ground Self-Defense Force Asaka Base
 Honda Technical Research Institute
 National Tax College
 National Route 254 (Kawagoekaidō avenue)
 Nihonium road (city road 113)

Bus services
The following long-distance express bus services operate from the south side of the station.

 Haneda Airport, operated by Airport Transport Service (Limousine Bus) and Seibu Bus
 Narita Airport, operated by Seibu Bus

See also
 List of railway stations in Japan

References

External links

 Tobu station information 
 Tokyo Metro station information 

Tobu Tojo Main Line
Tokyo Metro Yurakucho Line
Tokyo Metro Fukutoshin Line
Stations of Tobu Railway
Stations of Tokyo Metro
Railway stations in Saitama Prefecture
Railway stations in Japan opened in 1934
Wakō, Saitama